Willem Leloux (7 March 1893 – 15 September 1960) was a Dutch wrestler. He competed in the Greco-Roman middleweight event at the 1920 Summer Olympics.

References

External links
 

1893 births
1960 deaths
Olympic wrestlers of the Netherlands
Wrestlers at the 1920 Summer Olympics
Dutch male sport wrestlers
Sportspeople from Haarlem